The 2011 Tour de Romandie, was the 65th running of the Tour de Romandie cycling stage race. It started on 26 April in Martigny and ended on 1 May in Geneva and consisted of six stages, including a race-commencing prologue stage and also a penultimate day individual time trial. It was the 13th race of the 2011 UCI World Tour season.

The race was won by  rider Cadel Evans, who claimed the leader's yellow jersey for the second time – having previously won the race in 2006 – with an eighth-place finish on the penultimate time trial stage, and held his advantage to the end of the race. Evans' winning margin over runner-up Tony Martin was 18 seconds, and 's Alexander Vinokourov completed the podium, 19 seconds down on Evans.

In the race's other classifications,  rider Chris Anker Sørensen won the King of the Mountains classification, Matthias Brändle of  won the green jersey for the sprints classification, 's Andrew Talansky won the young rider classification, with  also finishing at the head of the teams classification.

Pre-race favourites

Pre-race favourites include the 2006 winner, Cadel Evans, 2009 winner, Roman Kreuziger and the 2010 winner Simon Špilak. Beside them there will be Ivan Basso, Paris–Nice's winner, Tony Martin and 's Luis León Sánchez.

Stages

Prologue
26 April 2011 – Martigny, individual time trial (ITT)

Prologue Result and General Classification after Prologue

Stage 1
27 April 2011 – Martigny to Leysin,

Stage 2
28 April 2011 – Romont,

Stage 3
29 April 2011 – Thierrens to Neuchâtel,

Stage 4
30 April 2011 – Aubonne to Bougy-Villars, individual time trial (ITT)

Stage 5
1 May 2011 – Champagne to Geneva,

Jersey progress

References

Tour de Romandie
Tour de Romandie
2011 in Swiss sport